Janne Korpi (born in Vihti on 5 February 1986) is a Finnish snowboarder and harness racing driver.

He is a three-time Olympian representing Finland in Snowboarding at the 2006 Winter Olympics, the 2010 Winter Olympics and the 2018 Winter Olympics.

Janne Korpi is a son of Pekka Korpi, one of the most famous harness racers in Finland. Janne himself has also successfully raced in harness racing.

References

External links
 
 

Olympic snowboarders of Finland
Finnish male snowboarders
Snowboarders at the 2006 Winter Olympics
Snowboarders at the 2010 Winter Olympics
Snowboarders at the 2014 Winter Olympics
Snowboarders at the 2018 Winter Olympics
Finnish harness racers
Living people
1986 births
Sportspeople from Uusimaa